Trechiella is a genus of beetles in the family Carabidae, containing the following species:

 Trechiella queenslandica Moore, 1972
 Trechiella subornatella (Blackburn, 1901)

References

Trechinae